The 2003 UEFA Intertoto Cup finals were won by Schalke 04, Villarreal, and Perugia. All three teams advanced to the UEFA Cup.

First round

First leg

This game was declared void by UEFA due to fan incident at the stadium with smoke bomb thrown onto the field. The second leg game by itself determined the result of the matchup.

Second leg

2–2 on aggregate, Pasching won on away goals rule.

Lierse won 7–1 on aggregate.

Pobeda won 7–2 on aggregate.

3–3 on aggregate, Partizani Tirana won on away goals rule.

3–3 on aggregate, Brno won on away goals rule.

Koper won 3–2 on aggregate.

Örgryte IS won 4–1 on aggregate.

3–3 on aggregate, Győr won on away goals rule.

Marek Dupnitsa won 5–4 on aggregate.

Shamrock Rovers won 3–1 on aggregate.

2–2 on aggregate, Tampere United won on away goals rule.

Sutjeska won 4–1 on aggregate.

Gloria Bistrița won 6–2 on aggregate.

OFK Beograd won 5–3 on aggregate.

Wil won 2–1 on aggregate.

Tobol won 5–1 on aggregate.

ZTS Dubnica won 7–1 on aggregate.

Dacia Chișinău won 5–1 on aggregate.

2–2 on aggregate, Sloboda Tuzla won on penalties.

Shakhtyor Soligorsk won 8–1 on aggregate.

Allianssi won 2–1 on aggregate.

Second round

First leg

Second leg

Allianssi won 1–0 on aggregate.

4–4 on aggregate, Nice won on away goals rule.

Slovácko won 4–3 on aggregate.

2–2 on aggregate, Racing de Santander won on away goals rule.

Slovan Liberec won 4–0 on aggregate.

Brno won 4–3 on aggregate.

Brescia won 3–2 on aggregate.

Wolfsburg won 3–1 on aggregate.

Cibalia won 5–3 on aggregate.

Tobol won 3–0 on aggregate.

Wil won 4–3 on aggregate.

Pasching won 3–2 on aggregate.

Lierse won 5–2 on aggregate.

Tampere United won 1–0 on aggregate.

Dacia Chișinău won 5–0 on aggregate.

3–3 on aggregate, Koper won on away goals rule.

Third round

First leg

Second leg

Pasching won 4–0 on aggregate.

Perugia won 4–0 on aggregate.

Koper won 5–4 on aggregate.

Nantes won 5–3 on aggregate.

Werder Bremen won 1–0 on aggregate.

Villarreal won 3–1 on aggregate.

Brno won 5–4 on aggregate.

Schalke 04 won 3–1 on aggregate.

Slovan Liberec won 3–1 on aggregate.

Wolfsburg won 3–0 on aggregate.

Cibalia won 2–1 on aggregate.

Heerenveen won 5–1 on aggregate.

Semi-finals

First leg

Second leg

Heerenveen won 2–1 on aggregate.

Wolfsburg won 8–1 on aggregate.

Schalke 04 won 2–1 on aggregate.

Pasching won 5–1 on aggregate.

Perugia won 1–0 on aggregate.

Villarreal won 3–1 on aggregate.

Finals

First leg

Second leg

Schalke 04 won 2–0 on aggregate.

Perugia won 3–0 on aggregate.

Villareal won 2–1 on aggregate.

See also
2003–04 UEFA Champions League
2003–04 UEFA Cup

References

External links
Official site
Results at RSSSF

UEFA Intertoto Cup
3